Roberto Latino Orsini (died 1520) was a Roman Catholic prelate who served as Archbishop of Reggio Calabria (1512–1520).

Biography
On 23 July 1512, Roberto Latino Orsini was appointed during the papacy of Pope Julius II as Archbishop of Reggio Calabria. He served as Archbishop of Reggio Calabria until his death in 1520.

References

External links and additional sources
 (for Chronology of Bishops) 
 (for Chronology of Bishops) 

16th-century Roman Catholic archbishops in the Kingdom of Naples
Bishops appointed by Pope Julius II
1520 deaths